John Ritchie (10 April 1944 – 16 February 2012) was an English footballer who played as a full-back for Whitley Bay, Port Vale, Preston North End, Bradford City, and Stafford Rangers in the 1960s and 1970s. He was a "tough, uncompromising full-back". After leaving the game Ritchie worked at HM Prison Werrington.

Career
Ritchie played for Whitley Bay, before joining Port Vale in December 1965. He made 22 Fourth Division appearances in the 1965–66 season, and scored his first goal in the Football League on 26 February, in a 3–1 win over Darlington at Vale Park. He scored three goals in 32 matches for Jackie Mudie's "Valiants" in the 1966–67 season, and scored a memorable forty-yard "goal of a lifetime" in a 2–1 win over Bradford City at Valley Parade in an FA Cup First Round match on 26 November. He was sold to Jimmy Milne's Preston North End for a £17,500 fee in April 1967. The "Lilywhites" finished one place above the Second Division zone in 1967–68, before rising up to 14th place in 1968–69. They were relegated in last place in 1969–70 under the stewardship of Bobby Seith, before new boss Alan Ball took Preston straight up as champions of the Third Division in 1970–71. Ritchie scored five goals in 93 league games during his time at Deepdale. Both Ritchie and Gerry Ingram were traded to Bryan Edwards's Bradford City for a £15,000 fee, who were relegated into the Fourth Division in 1971–72. He later played in the Northern Premier League for Stafford Rangers.

Career statistics
Source:

References

1944 births
2012 deaths
Sportspeople from Ashington
Footballers from Northumberland
English footballers
Association football fullbacks
Whitley Bay F.C. players
Port Vale F.C. players
Preston North End F.C. players
Bradford City A.F.C. players
Stafford Rangers F.C. players
English Football League players
Northern Premier League players
British prison officers